Independence-friendly logic (IF logic; proposed by Jaakko Hintikka and  in 1989) is an extension of classical first-order logic (FOL) by means of slashed quantifiers of the form  and , where  is a finite set of variables. IF logic allows one to express more general patterns of dependence between variables than those which are implicit in first-order logic. This greater level of generality leads to an actual increase in expressive power; the set of IF sentences can characterize the same classes of structures as existential second-order logic. 

For example, it can express branching quantifier sentences, such as the formula   which expresses infinity in the empty signature; this cannot be done in FOL.

The introduction of IF logic was partly motivated by the attempt of extending the game semantics of first-order logic to games of imperfect information. Indeed, a semantics for IF sentences can be given in terms of these kinds of games (or, alternatively, by means of a translation procedure to existential second-order logic). A semantics for open formulas cannot be given in the form of a Tarskian semantics; an adequate semantics must specify what it means for a formula to be satisfied by a set of assignments of common variable domain (a team) rather than satisfaction by a single assignment. Such a team semantics was developed by Hodges.

Independence-friendly logic is translation equivalent, at the level of sentences, with a number of other logical systems based on team semantics, such as dependence logic, dependence-friendly logic, exclusion logic and independence logic; with the exception of the latter, IF logic is known to be equiexpressive to these logics also at the level of open formulas. However, IF logic differs from all the above-mentioned systems in that it lacks locality: the meaning of an open formula cannot be described just in terms of the free variables of the formula; it is instead dependent on the context in which the formula occurs.

Independence-friendly logic shares a number of metalogical properties with first-order logic, but there are some differences, including lack of closure under (classical, contradictory) negation and higher complexity for deciding the validity of formulas.

Hintikka argued that IF and extended IF logic should be used as a basis for the foundations of mathematics; this proposal was met in some cases with skepticism.

Syntax 

A number of slightly different presentations of independence-friendly logic have appeared in the literature; here we follow Mann et al (2011).

Terms and atomic formulas
For a fixed signature σ, terms and atomic formulas are defined exactly as in first-order logic with equality.

IF formulas

Formulas of IF logic are defined as follows:

 Any atomic formula  is an IF formula.
 If  is an IF formula, then  is an IF formula. 

Free variables

The set  of the free variables of an IF formula  is defined inductively as follows:
 
 If  is an atomic formula, then  is the set of all variables occurring in it. 
 ;
 ;
 .

The last clause is the only one that differs from the clauses for first-order logic, the difference being that also the variables in the slash set  are counted as free variables.

IF Sentences

An IF formula  such that  is an IF sentence.

Semantics 

Three main approaches have been proposed for the definition of the semantics of IF logic. The first two, based respectively on games of imperfect information and on Skolemization, are mainly used in the definition of IF sentences only. The former generalizes a similar approach, for first-order logic, which was based instead on games of perfect information.
The third approach, team semantics, is a compositional semantics in the spirit of Tarskian semantics. However, this semantics does not define what it means for a formula to be satisfied by an assignment (rather, by a set of assignments).
The first two approaches were developed in earlier publications on if logic; the third one by Hodges in 1997.

Since the three approaches are fundamentally equivalent, only the symbol  will be used in the rest of the article.

Game-Theoretical Semantics 

Game-Theoretical Semantics assigns truth values to IF sentences according to the properties of some 2-player games of imperfect information. 
For ease of presentation, it is convenient to associate games not only to sentences, but also to formulas. More precisely, one defines games  for each triple formed by an IF formula , a structure , and an assignment .

Players 

The semantic game  has two players, called Eloise (or Verifier) and Abelard (or Falsifier).

Game rules 

The allowed moves in the semantic game  are determined by the synctactical structure of the formula under consideration.
For simplicity, we first assume that  is in negation normal form, with negations symbols occurring only in front of atomic subformulas.

 If , then Abelard chooses one of the subformulas , and the corresponding game  is played. 
 If , then Eloises chooses one of the subformulas , and the corresponding game  is played. 

More generally, if  is not in negation normal form, we can state, as a rule for negation, that, when a game  is reached, the players begin playing a dual game  in which the roles of Verifiers and Falsifier are switched.

Histories 
Informally, a sequence of moves in a game  is a history.

Given two assignments  of same domain, and  we write  if  on any variable .

Imperfect information is introduced in the games by stipulating that certain histories are indistinguishable for the associated player; indistinguishable histories are said to form an 'information set'.
We also stipulate, in general, reflexivity of this relation: if , then ; and if , then .

Strategies 

For a fixed game , write  for the set of histories to which Eloise is associated, and similarly  for the set of histories of Abelard.

A strategy for Eloise in the game  is any function that assigns, to any possible history in which it is Eloise's turn to play, a legal move; more precisely, any function  such that  for every history . One can define dually the strategies of Abelard.

A strategy for Eloise is uniform if, whenever , ; for Abelard, if  implies .

Similarly for Abelard.

Truth, falsity, indeterminacy 

An IF sentence  is true in a structure  if Eloise has a uniform winning strategy in the game . 
It is false if Abelard has a winning strategy.
It is undetermined if neither Eloise nor Abelard has a winning strategy.

Conservativity 

The semantics of IF logic thus defined is a conservative extension of first-order semantics, in the following sense. If  is an IF sentence with empty slash sets, associate to it the first-order formula  which is identical to it, except in that each IF quantifier  is replaced by the corresponding first-order quantifier . Then  iff  in the Tarskian sense; and  iff  in the Tarskian sense.

Open formulas 

More general games can be used to assign a meaning to (possibly open) IF formulas; more exactly, it is possible to define what it means for an IF formula  to be satisfied, on a structure , by a team  (a set of assignments of common variable domain  and codomain ).
The associated games  begin with the random choice of an assignment ; after this initial move, the game 
 is played. The existence of a winning strategy for Eloise defines positive satisfaction, and existence of a winning strategy for Abelard defines negative satisfaction.
At this level of generality, Game-theoretical Semantics can be replaced by an algebraic approach, team semantics (defined below).

Skolem Semantics 

A definition of truth for IF sentences can be given, alternatively, by means of a translation into existential second-order logic. The translation generalizes the Skolemization procedure of first-order logic. Falsity is defined by a dual procedure called Kreiselization.

Skolemization 

Given an IF formula , we first define its skolemization relativized to a finite set  of variables.

 if  is a literal.  
.
.
.

Kreiselization 

Given an IF formula , associate, to each universal quantifier  occurring in it, a new function symbol  (a "Kreisel function"). Then, the Kreiselization  of  relative to a finite set of variables , is defined by the following inductive clauses:

 if  is a literal.  
.
.

Truth, falsity, indeterminacy 

An IF sentence is true on a structure , written , if there is a tuple  of functions such that .
Similarly,  if there is a tuple  of functions such that ; and  iff neither of the previous conditions holds.

For any IF sentence, Skolem Semantics returns the same values as Game-theoretical Semantics.

Team Semantics 

By means of team semantics, it is possible to give a compositional account of the semantics of IF logic. Truth and falsity are grounded on the notion of 'satisfiability of a formula by a team'.

Teams 

Let   be a structure and let  be a finite set of variables.

Duplicating and supplementing teams 

Duplicating and supplementing are two operations on teams which are related to the semantics of universal and existential quantification.

Given a team  over a structure  and a variable , the duplicating team  is the team .
Given a team  over a structure , a function  and a variable , the supplementing team  is the team .

Uniform functions on teams 

As above, given two assignments  with same variable domain, we write  if  for every variable .

Given a team  on a structure  and a finite set  of variables, we say that a function  is -uniform if  whenever .

Semantic clauses 

Team semantics is three-valued, in the sense that a formula may happen to be positively satisfied by a team on a given structure, or negatively satisfied by it, or neither. The semantics clauses for positive and negative satisfaction are defined by simultaneous induction on the synctactical structure of IF formulas.

Positive satisfaction:

  if and only if, for every assignment ,  in the sense of first-order logic (that is, the tuple  is in the interpretation  of ).
  if and only if, for every assignment ,  in the sense of first-order logic (that is).
  if and only if .
  if and only if .
  if and only if there exists a -uniform function such that .

Negative satisfaction:

  if and only if, for every assignment ,  .
  if and only if .
  if and only if there exists a -uniform function such that .
  if and only if .

Truth, falsity, indeterminacy 

Relationship with Game-Theoretical Semantics 

For any team  on a structure , and any IF formula , we have:
 iff 
and
 iff .

Notions of equivalence 

Since IF logic is, in its usual acception, three-valued, multiple notions of formula equivalence are of interest.

Equivalence of formulas 

Let  be two IF formulas.

 ( truth entails ) if  for any structure  and any team  such that .

 ( falsity entails ) if  for any structure  and any team  such that .

Equivalence of sentences 

The definitions above specialize for IF sentences as follows.
Two IF sentences  are truth equivalent if they are true in the same structures; they are falsity equivalent if they are false in the same structures; they are strongly equivalent if they are both truth and falsity equivalent.

Intuitively, using strong equivalence amounts to considering IF logic as 3-valued (true/undetermined/false), while truth equivalence treats IF sentences as if they were 2-valued (true/untrue).

Equivalence relative to a context 

Many logical rules of IF logic can be adequately expressed only in terms of more restricted notions of equivalence, which take into account the context in which a formula might appear.

Model-theoretic properties

Sentence level 

IF sentences can be translated in a truth-preserving fashion into sentences of (functional) existential second-order logic by means of the Skolemization procedure (see above). Vice versa, every  can be translated into an IF sentence by means of a variant of the Walkoe-Enderton translation procedure for partially-ordered quantifiers.

We denote by  a (possibly infinite) set of IF sentences.

 Löwenheim-Skolem property: if  has an infinite model, or arbitrarily large finite models, than it has models of every infinite cardinality.
 Existential compactness: if every finite  has a model, then also  has a model.
 Failure of deductive compactness: there are  such that , but  for any finite . This is a difference from FOL.
This is a consequence of Craig's interpolation theorem for FOL.
In particular, this theorem reveals that the negation of IF logic is not a semantical operation with respect to truth equivalence (truth-equivalent sentences may have non-equivalent negations).
 Definability of truth: there is an IF sentence , in the language of Peano Arithmetic, such that, for any IF sentence ,  (where  denotes a Gödel numbering). A weaker statement also holds for nonstandard models of Peano Arithmetic.

Formula level 

The notion of satisfiability by a team has the following properties:

Consistency:  and  if and only if .
Non-locality: there are  such that .

Since IF formulas are satisfied by teams and formulas of classical logics are satisfied by assignments, there is no obvious intertranslation between IF formulas and formulas of some classical logic system. However, there is a translation procedure of IF formulas into sentences of relational  (actually, one distinct translation  for each finite  and for each choice of a predicate symbol  of arity ). In this kind of translation, an extra n-ary predicate symbol  is used to represent an n-variable team . This is motivated by the fact that, once an ordering  of the variables of  has been fixed, it is possible to associate a relation  to the team . With this conventions, an IF formula is related to its translation thus:
   
where  is the expansion of  that assigns  as interpretation for the predicate .

In 2009, Kontinen and Väänänen, showed, by means of a partial inverse translation procedure, that the families of relations that are definable by IF logic are exactly those that are nonempty, downward closed and definable in relational  with an extra predicate  (or, equivalently, nonempty and definable by a  sentence in which  occurs only negatively).

Extended IF logic 

IF logic is not closed under classical negation. Hintikka (1996, p. 196) claimed that "virtually all of classical mathematics can in principle be done in extended IF first-order logic".

Properties and critique 
(Väänänen, 2007, p. 86). However, Väänänen (2001) proved that the set of Gödel numbers of valid sentences of IF logic with at least one binary
predicate symbol (set denoted by ValIF) is recursively isomorphic with the corresponding set of Gödel numbers of valid (full) second-order sentences in a vocabulary that contains one binary predicate symbol (set denoted by Val2). Väänänen (2007, pp. 136–139) summarizes the complexity results as follows:

Feferman (2006) cites Väänänen's 2001 result to argue (contra Hintikka) that while satisfiability might be a first-order matter, the question of whether there is a winning strategy for Verifier over all structures in general "lands us squarely in full second order logic" (emphasis Feferman's). Feferman also attacked the claimed usefulness of the extended IF logic, because the sentences in  do not admit a game-theoretic interpretation.

See also 
 Game Semantics
 Branching Quantifiers
 Dependence Logic

Notes

References

External links 
 
 
 IF logic on Planet Math

Systems of formal logic
Philosophical logic
Non-classical logic